Terry Carlisle (born August 24, 1954) is an American sports shooter. She competed in the mixed skeet event at the 1988 Summer Olympics.

References

External links
 

1954 births
Living people
American female sport shooters
Olympic shooters of the United States
Shooters at the 1988 Summer Olympics
Sportspeople from Downey, California
Pan American Games medalists in shooting
Pan American Games gold medalists for the United States
Shooters at the 1999 Pan American Games
21st-century American women
20th-century American women